Tahrud and Tahrood may refer to:
 Tahrud, Kerman
 Tahrud, Sistan and Baluchestan